The Giona is a ‘torrent’, or intermittent stream, which rises on the slopes of Monte Tamaro, in the Swiss canton of Ticino. Its course passes through the communes of Indemini in Switzerland and Veddasca, Curiglia con Monteviasco, Dumenza and Maccagno in Italy.

The fish found in the river are predominantly Salmonidae, Cyprinidae and Cottidae, in particular brown trout, grayling, chub, vairone and European bullhead.

The river is put to use as a source of hydropower.

Notes

Rivers of Italy
Rivers of Ticino
Rivers of Lombardy
Rivers of the Province of Varese
International rivers of Europe
Rivers of Switzerland